Bala Qusar (also, Bala Kusar and Bala-Kusary) is a village and municipality in the Qusar Rayon of Azerbaijan.  It has a population of 1,382.

References 

Populated places in Qusar District